Mouryan is a 2006 Indian Malayalam film, directed by Kailas Rao. The film stars Abbas, Geethu Mohandas, Geetha, and Suja Karthika in lead roles. The film had musical score by Kaithapram Vishwanathan Nambudiri.

Cast
Abbas
Geethu Mohandas
Geetha
Suja Karthika
Jagathy Sreekumar
Manorama
Rajan P. Dev
Indrans
Harishree Ashokan
Vijayaraghavan
Kochu Preman
Devan

Soundtrack
The music was composed by Kaithapram Vishwanathan Nambudiri and the lyrics were written by Kaithapram.

References

2006 films
2000s Malayalam-language films